"Run Run Run" (typeset "RUN☆RUN☆RUN" on the cover) is the third single by Japanese rock band High and Mighty Color.

Information

"Run Run Run" is the band's third single. It is more on the pop side than the previous single and was described as a song for the summer by the group's official website. "Run Run Run" was used in advertisements for the Lotte Chewing Gum "Pure White Citrus".

Now, I'm running toward you!
I won't stop! I can't be stopped anymore
Throwing my hands up, I jump high!
The sun sparkles and shines
Don't stop!
Hey, get up!
The sky is so blue
So this isn't worthless yet

Track listing

 "RUN☆RUN☆RUN  – 4:21
 "Hopelessness" – 4:41
 "RUN☆RUN☆RUN  (Instrumental)" – 4:20

All songs written by HIGH and MIGHTY COLOR.

Personnel
 Maakii & Yuusuke — vocals
 Kazuto — guitar
 MEG — guitar
 maCKAz — bass
 SASSY — drums

Charts
Oricon Sales Chart (Japan)

References

2005 singles
Run Run Run
2005 songs